Willi Landers (born *1939) is a slalom canoeist who competed for East Germany in the 1960s. He won two medals at the ICF Canoe Slalom World Championships with a gold (C-2 team: 1967) and a silver (Mixed C-2: 1961). He was born in Bützow.

References

German male canoeists
Living people
Medalists at the ICF Canoe Slalom World Championships
1939 births